Interzone is a 1987 Italian sci-fi action film produced by Trans World Entertainment and directed by Deran Sarafian, with original music composed by Stefano Mainetti, starring Bruce Abbott, Beatrice Ring, and Teagan Clive.

Plot
A supernaturally gifted monk, "Panasonic" (Kiro Wehara), is sent on a mission by his dying master, "General Electric," to protect the Interzone, the last fertile region left on a post-apocalyptic Earth, against an invading gang of wasteland raiders.

Along the way, Panasonic is helped by Swan (Bruce Abbott), a roguish road warrior who seeks a rumored treasure hidden within the Interzone, and Tera (Beatrice Ring), an attractive slave girl, whom Swan falls in love with. The raiders meanwhile are led by Mantis (Teagan Clive), a female bodybuilder dominatrix and her sadistic partner Balzakan (John Armstead).

After the defeat of the raiders, Swan locates the treasure which is revealed to be a fallout shelter turned archive of some of mankind's greatest achievements. Within are various items such as books, sculptures and paintings, along with a Panasonic-brand videocassette recorder that plays a final message from those who preserved the artifacts before the apocalypse.

Cast

Production

Distribution
Interzone was distributed on home video by EV in the United Kingdom in December 1989.

Reception
Million Monkey Theater wrote that the film is plagued by a shoe-string budget, amateurish filming, editing, audio dubbing, acting and dialog.  The film received one out of five stars in Creature Feature. Outpost Zeta was kinder to the movie, finding that the humor in the film made it worth the effort to watch.

References

External links

1987 films
English-language Italian films
Italian post-apocalyptic films
Films directed by Deran Sarafian
Films scored by Stefano Mainetti
1980s science fiction horror films
Italian science fiction horror films
Films shot in Lazio
1980s English-language films
1980s Italian films